Ákos Szendrei (born 23 January 2003) is a Hungarian football centre-forward who plays for Győr on loan from DAC Dunajská Streda of the Fortuna Liga.

Club career

DAC Dunajská Streda
DAC signed Szendrei as a prospective and talented player in early September 2021 on a five-year contract.

Loan to Győr
On 18 January 2023, Szendrei was loaned by Győr.

Career statistics
.

References

External links
 
 

2003 births
People from Szekszárd
Sportspeople from Tolna County
Living people
Hungarian footballers
Hungary youth international footballers
Association football forwards
Paksi FC players
FC DAC 1904 Dunajská Streda players
Fehérvár FC players
Győri ETO FC players
Nemzeti Bajnokság I players
Slovak Super Liga players
Nemzeti Bajnokság II players
Hungarian expatriate footballers
Expatriate footballers in Slovakia
Hungarian expatriate sportspeople in Slovakia